Carex liparocarpos is a species of sedge (genus Carex), native to southern Europe, and the Atlas and Caucasus regions. It is typically found growing in sandy steppes, dunes, riverine gravel deposits, and scree.

Subtaxa
The following subspecies are currently accepted:
Carex liparocarpos subsp. bordzilowskii (V.I.Krecz.) T.V.Egorova
Carex liparocarpos subsp. liparocarpos

References

liparocarpos
Plants described in 1804